San José Island() is a river island in the Rio Negro, located at the easternmost part of Colombia. Administratively,  it is located in the municipality of La Guadalupe in the Guainía Department.
It is located in front of the Piedra del Cocuy. It serves as endpoint of the borders with Venezuela and with Brazil, for which it is considered a trifinio .

The climate is tropical, with a temperature of 22 °C. The warmest month is February at 24°C and the coolest is June at 20°C. Average precipitation is 4,286 millimeters per year. The month with the most precipitation is May, with 571 millimeters of rain, and the month with the least is November, with 216 millimeters.

References

River islands of Colombia
Geography of Guainía Department